Pseudopostega longifurcata is a moth of the family Opostegidae. It was described by Donald R. Davis and Jonas R. Stonis, 2007. It is known from Jamaica and Ecuador.

The length of the forewings is 2.5–4 mm. Adults have been recorded in January (in Ecuador) and April (in Jamaica)

Etymology
The species name is derived from the Latin longus (meaning long) and furcatus (meaning forked), in reference to the deeply furcate apex of the male gnathos.

References

Opostegidae
Moths described in 2007